A list of films produced in Turkey in the 1980s:

1980s

References

External links
 Turkish films at the Internet Movie Database

1980s
Lists of 1980s films
Films